The Herminiinae are a subfamily of moths in the family Erebidae. The members of the subfamily are called litter moths because the caterpillars of most members feed on dead leaves of plants, though others feed on living leaves, and/or the mushrooms of fungi as in the case of genus Idia (moth).

Taxonomy
The subfamily was previous treated as a separate family, Herminiidae, or as a subfamily of the family Noctuidae. Phylogenetic analysis has determined that the Herminiinae are most closely related to the subfamily Aganainae of the Erebidae.

Genera

Aristaria
Bleptina
Carteris
Chytolita
Drepanopalpia
Herminia 
Hydrillodes
Hypenula
Idia
Lascoria
Macristis
Macrochilo
Nodaria
Orectis
Palthis
Paracolax
Phalaenophana
Phalaenostola
Phlyctaina
Physula
Polypogon
Reabotis
Redectis
Rejectaria
Renia
Simplicia
Tetanolita
Zanclognatha

Example species

References

External links 

 Markku Savela's Lepidoptera and some other life forms: Herminiinae. Version of 2003-MAR-28. Retrieved 2007-JUN-03.

 
Moth subfamilies